Esselenia is a genus of slant-faced grasshoppers in the family Acrididae. There is one described species in Esselenia, E. vanduzeei.

Esselenia vanduzeei has two described subspecies:

 Esselenia vanduzeei vanduzeei Hebard, 1920
 Esselenia vanduzeei violae Rentz, 1966

References

Further reading
 

 
 
 

Acrididae
Articles created by Qbugbot